James Robert Magnuson (August 18, 1946 – May 30, 1991) was a Major League Baseball pitcher who played in  and  with the Chicago White Sox and in  with the New York Yankees. He batted right and threw left-handed. Magnuson had a 2–7 record in 36 career games.

Personal life 
Magnuson was born in Marinette, Wisconsin, the oldest of five children. His parents were Harry J. and Florence I. Magnuson of Marinette. An alumnus of the University of Wisconsin–Oshkosh, Magnuson was married with two children. He died of alcohol poisoning in Green Bay, Wisconsin in 1991.

References

External links

Major League Baseball pitchers
New York Yankees players
Chicago White Sox players
Evansville White Sox players
Columbus White Sox players
Lynchburg White Sox players
Syracuse Chiefs players
Mobile White Sox players
Tucson Toros players
Fox Cities Foxes players
Baseball players from Wisconsin
People from Marinette, Wisconsin
Wisconsin–Oshkosh Titans baseball players
1946 births
1991 deaths
Accidental deaths in Wisconsin
Alcohol-related deaths in Wisconsin
Deaths by poisoning
Florida Instructional League White Sox players